Ritchie Patterson is a physicist at Cornell University known for her research using the Large Hadron Collider to examine dark matter and the disappearance of antimatter. She is a fellow of the American Physical Society and an elected member of the American Association for the Advancement of Science.

Education and career 
Patterson has a B.A. from Cornell University (1981) and a Ph.D. from the University of Chicago (1990). Following her Ph.D., she returned to Cornell where was promoted to professor in 2005. Patterson is the director of the Cornell Laboratory for Accelerator-based Sciences and Education (CLASSE) and the Center for Bright Beams (CBB), a science and technology center funded by the National Science Foundation.

Research 
Patterson's research centers on the use of the Large Hadron Collider to search for particles with long lifetimes.

Selected publications

Awards and honors 
 National Young Investigator, National Science Foundation (1994 to 1999)
 Fellow, American Physical Society (2003)
Elected member, American Association for the Advancement of Science (2019)

References

External links 
Center for Bright Beams

Fellows of the American Physical Society
University of Chicago alumni
Cornell University faculty
Women physicists
Cornell University alumni
Year of birth missing (living people)
Living people